The Lyde Baronetcy, of Ayot St Lawrence in the County of Hertford, was title in the Baronetage of Great Britain.  It was created on 13 October 1772 for Lyonel Lyde.  The title became extinct on his death in 1791.

Lyde baronets, of Ayot St Lawrence (1772)
 Sir Lyonel Lyde, 1st Baronet (1724–1791)

References

External links

Extinct baronetcies in the Baronetage of Great Britain